Punginipatti  is a village in the Annavasal revenue block of Pudukkottai district, Tamil Nadu, India.

Demographics 

As per the 2011 census, Punginipatti had a total population of 1912 with 925 males and 987 females. It has an average literacy rate of 64.86%.

References

Villages in Pudukkottai district